Agriculture in Sweden differs by region. This is due to different soils and different climate zones, with many parts of the country being more suitable to forestry. It makes more economic sense to dedicate land to forestry than agriculture in the northern and mountainous parts of the country.

The southern tip of Sweden is the most agriculturally productive. Sweden has quite short growing seasons in most parts of the country that limits the species and productivity of agriculture, but the south has the longest growing season, in some parts of the south in excess of 240 days. Wheat, rapeseed and other oil plants, and sugar beet are common in southern Sweden, while barley and oat are more important further north. Barley and oat are grown mostly for animal feed especially for pigs and poultry.

The Central Swedish lowland is the traditional centre of agriculture in Sweden.

Swedish agriculture in figures 
The Swedish agricultural sector (forestry and food industry not included) employs 177,600 people, which is 1.5 percent of the Swedish workforce. There are 72,000 farms and other agricultural business, which is half the number of 1970. The average farm has  of fields.

Dairy farming is the largest sector in economical terms, and is responsible for 20 per cent of the value of the Swedish agricultural production. Pork and poultry production is also relatively large, while sheep and lamb production is quite small. Sheep and lamb production and the production of wool cannot compete with Australian and New Zealand production as these countries have green pastures year-round.

History

Agriculture and animal husbandry took place in the area (today's Sweden) already during the Stone Age. Barley was the most important crop, but wheat, millet and flax were also cultivated. The christianization of Sweden, around the year 1000, led to improvements in agriculture due to the influx of knowledge of more advanced cultivation methods from southern countries. During the entire medieval period, monasterial gardens served to spread foreign plants suitable for cultivation, and agricultural knowledge.

During the time of Gustaf Vasa in the 16th century, who took a personal interest in the improvement of the royal properties, a period of agricultural flourishing started, and Sweden was regularly a cereal-exporting country. This lasted until the wars of Charles XII in the early 18th century, which took a heavy toll on the countryside population and meant that the cereal-producing Baltic provinces were lost.

By the mid-18th century land reforms were initiated (storskiftet) which meant that scattered land plots around villages were progressively redistributed into coherent holdings, which gave the possibility for more rational farming. Swedish scientists also gave attention to the improvement of agriculture, with botanist Carl Linnaeus and agricultural chemist Johan Gottschalk Wallerius as the foremost representatives. However, the mercantilist views of the era guided most governmental activities.

In the wake of the Finnish War of 1808-1809, agricultural improvements received significant interest from the Swedish government and private actors. An important role was played by the Royal Swedish Academy of Agriculture, which was founded in 1811, as well as by the Rural Economy and Agricultural Societies, which were founded in most Swedish counties around this time. The production of distilled beverages, brännvin, was regulated and the land reforms were continued. New areas, especially wetlands, were used for cultivation, and cultivation methods were improved. This was especially true for the production of fodder, which benefited from the cultivation of nitrogen-fixating plants such as clover and alfalfa. Many meadows were converted to farmed land with fodder crops, which significantly improved the amount of fodder available. Improved crop cultivation received most attention in the first half of the 19th century, while improvement of animal husbandry progressively came more in focus later in the century. Selected foreign breeds were purchased and made available in breeding stations.
(1702-1864)
All farms in Sweden were taxed based on their production capacity, so manorialism hit Sweden like a wave. Manorialism is a social and economic system that allows the wealthy to control the poor whilst providing for the needs of the poor. “About one-third of the land, in terms of mantal, was owned by the nobility in the early eighteenth century”(Olsson, Svenson, Agricultural Growth and Institution: Sweden). Due to two different enclosure movements, manorialism fell just as quickly as it came.  In the 19th grain quickly became Sweden’s number one export (instead of being an import).

Growth of dairy sector and industrialization (1860–1960)
From the late 1860s, dairy production, and in particular production of butter, became more and more central to the Swedish agricultural economy. A progressively larger portion of the farmland was devoted to fodder production, and the farmed area increased until the 1920s. Milk- and dairy-related income was the most important source income for Swedish agricultural business around the turn of the century. This meant that the earlier Swedish cereal exports mostly vanished, and were replaced by imports of cereals for bread making. On the other hand, significant exports of butter started to take place, and later also of pork and live pigs. In the first years of the 20th century, Sweden exported 16,000-20,000 tons of butter per year.

In the late 1940s, milking machines replaced hand milking and tractors started to replace the use of horses. Alfa Laval became a well-known manufacturer and brand of milking machines. In the 1950s, a large-scale mechanisation took place, using cheap supplies of petrol fuels. The Swedish agricultural workforce was reduced by 60 percent from 1945 to 1970, and labour was freed up for employment in the industrial sector.

Deregulation and re-regulation (1989–2000)
In 1989, Sweden deregulated its agricultural policy and finally scrapped many subsidies and price controls which originally had been introduced in the 1930s, when the agricultural sector experienced an economic crisis. In 1995, when Sweden joined the European Union, the Swedish agricultural sector again became subject to various regulations, via the Common Agricultural Policy.

References